Robin Gibson may refer to:

 Robin Gibson (architect) (1930–2014), Australian architect
 Robin Gibson (footballer) (born 1979), English footballer
 Robin Warwick Gibson (1944–2010), British gallery curator and art historian